Jennifer Clement (born 1960) is an American-Mexican author. In 2015, she was elected as the first woman president of PEN International, an organization that was founded in 1921.  Under her leadership, the groundbreaking PEN International Women's Manifesto and The Democracy of the Imagination Manifesto were created. She also served as President of PEN Mexico from 2009 to 2012. Clement's books have been translated into 36 languages.

Clement is the author of four novels: Gun Love, Prayers for the Stolen, A True Story Based on Lies and The Poison That Fascinates. She also wrote the cult classic memoir Widow Basquiat and has published several volumes of poetry including The Next Stranger with an introduction by W. S. Merwin. Her most recent novel, "Auf de Zunge", is published by Suhrkamp in Germany in April 2022.

Early life
Born in 1960 in Greenwich, Connecticut, Clement moved in 1961 with her family to Mexico City, where she later attended Edron Academy. She moved to the United States to finish high school at Cranbrook Kingswood School, before studying English Literature and Anthropology at New York University. She received her MFA from the University of Southern Maine.

She is the co-director and founder, with her sister Barbara Sibley, of the San Miguel Poetry Week. Clement lives in Mexico City, Mexico.

Career
Clement's first book, Widow Basquiat, is a memoir about artist Jean-Michel Basquiat's relationship with his muse Suzanne Mallouk—told from Mallouk's perspective. It was originally published in 2000 and re-released in 2014 as Widow Basquiat: A Love Story. Glenn O'Brien in Artforum wrote: "Magical…Widow Basquiat conjures real characters, a real time and real place. It's not theory – it's representation. … The life of Basquiat … is a joyous lightning bolt when it is described in true detail, as it is in Clement's extraordinary as-told-to poem."  Her first novel, A True Story Based on lies, was finalist in the Orange Prize for Fiction.

Prayers for the Stolen came out in 2014 and became a New York Times Book Review Editor's Choice Book, First Selection for National Reading Group Month's Great Group Reads and appeared internationally on many "Best Books of the Year" lists, including The Irish Times.

She is also the author of several books of poetry: The Next Stranger with an introduction by W. S. Merwin (1993), Newton's Sailor, Lady of the Broom (2002) and Jennifer Clement: New and Selected Poems (2008). Her prize-winning story A Salamander-Child is published as an art book with work by the Mexican painter Gustavo Monroy.

Clement was awarded the National Endowment of the Arts Fellowship for Literature in 2012 for her novel Prayers for the Stolen and was honored with The Sara Curry Humanitarian Award for that work. She is also the recipient of the UK's Canongate Prize. Clement is a Santa Maddalena Fellow, the MacDowell Colony's Robert and Stephanie Olmsted Fellow for 2007-08 and, in 2015, was chosen to be a City of Asylum Resident in Pittsburgh, PA. In 2016, she was awarded a Guggenheim Fellowship for her new novel Gun Love.  Gun Love was named one of Time magazine's top 10 books of 2019 and was also a New York Times Editor's Choice Book, and a National Book Award finalist, among other honors.

She is a member of Mexico's prestigious Sistema Nacional de Creadores de Arte. Jennifer Clement, along with her sister Barbara Sibley, is the founder and director The San Miguel Poetry Week.

As President of PEN Mexico she spoke extensively about the safety of journalists in Mexico and was instrumental in raising the issue and changing the law so that the killing of a journalist became a federal crime.

Upcoming movies include:

 Prayers for the Stolen, directed by Tatiana Huezo (titled Noche de fuego) and produced by Nicolas Celis and Jim Stark at Pimienta Films was Mexico's entry for the 2022 Oscars.  Among many prizes, the film was awarded the Cannes Film Festival's Un Certain Regard Award.
 Gun Love directed by Julie Taymor and produced by Nick Wechsler and Chockstone Pictures partners Steve Schwartz and Paula Mae Schwartz as well as Lynn Hendee and Julie Taymor.

Awards and honors
Sydney Harman Writer-in-Residence, Baruch College (City University of New York), 2020
Gun Love: National Book Award, finalist, 2018
Gun Love: Time magazine top 10 books of 2019
Gun Love: A New York Times Editor's Choice Book, 2018
Guggenheim Fellowship, USA, 2016
HIPGiver Honor (honoring Latinos who have made exceptional contributions to their communities), USA, 2016 
Hermitage Residency, USA, 2016
Grand Prix des Lectrices Lyceenes de Elle (sponsored by Elle Magazine, the French Ministry of Education and Maison des écrivains et de la littérature) France, 2015  
PEN/Faulkner Award for Fiction Finalist, USA, 2015
City of Asylum Resident, Pittsburgh, PA, USA, 2015
Community College of Baltimore County, Essex - Prayers for the Stolen: selected novel for the Community Book Connection Program 2015–2106
The Irish Times Best Books List 2014 
The Sara Curry Humanitarian Award, 2014
Santa Maddalena Fellowship, Italy, 2014
Shortlist Prix Femina, France, 2014
Prayers for the Stolen: A New York Times Editor's Choice Book, 2014
National Endowment for the Arts Fellowship in Fiction, 2012
President of PEN Mexico, 2009–2012
The Sandburg-Auden-Stein Poet-in-Residence, Olivet College, 2011
Writer-in-Residence Pen, Vlaanderen, Antwerp, Belgium, 2010
The Thornton Writer-in-Residence, Lynchburg College, VA, 2009
Robert and Stephanie Olmsted Fellow, 2007–2008 (awarded by The MacDowell Colony)
MacDowell Colony Fellowship, 2007
Residency in Berlin granted by the Goethe Institute and Literarisches Colloquium Berlin, 2004
Finalist in the Orange Prize for Fiction, 2002, UK (for A True Story Based on Lies)
The Canongate Prize for New Writing 2001, UK (judged by The Herald, The Sunday Herald, Waterstone's, Channel Four, BBC, and Canongate Books)
The Bookseller's Choice List, 2000, UK, (for the memoir Widow Basquiat)
U.S.-Mexico Fund for Culture (Conaculta/Fonca/Bancomer/The Rockefeller Foundation) grant in support of The San Miguel Poetry Week
Mexico's "Sistema Nacional de Creadores" grant, FONCA, 2000–2006 and 2012 to present

References

1960 births
20th-century American novelists
20th-century American women writers
21st-century American novelists
21st-century American women writers
American emigrants to Mexico
American women novelists
Living people
New York University alumni
Novelists from Connecticut
PEN/Faulkner Award for Fiction winners
People from Mexico City
Writers from Greenwich, Connecticut